Patterson Mill Middle and High School opened in August 2007 in Harford County, Maryland, US. Built for $50 million, the  building is a state of the art school that includes a television studio, a mass communications lab for a radio station, and a graphics and visual communications area.

About the school
The school has 66,000 square feet of instructional space and is situated on a 78-acre campus just south of Bel Air, Maryland. The school serves a large suburban residential community. Patterson Mill is a comprehensive, state of the art middle and high school with a computer to student ratio of 1:1. Site-specific facilities include such items as: a mass communications lab with a radio station, a television studio, a black box theatre, an auditorium that seats 900 people, a sculpture studio, a graphics lab, a visual communications lab, a child development lab and center, a clothing/design lab, computer labs, a pre-engineering lab, a flex (foreign language) program for all eighth-graders, and multiple Seminar and Extended Learning Rooms. The classrooms in the building are equally outfitted for the 21st century, with LCD projectors, interactive white boards, high definition televisions, laptop computers, desktop computers, and other traditional media found in most standard classrooms.

Students
The school currently houses approximately 1700 students in sixth through twelfth grades. The first graduating class from Patterson Mill was the class of 2010.

Principals
 Mr. Wayne Thibeault, 2007-2013
 Dr. Sean Abel, 2013–Present

Sports
Patterson Mill competes at the varsity and junior varsity level in the Upper Chesapeake Bay Athletic Conference in all offered sports. The sports offered at Patterson Mill include baseball, boys' and girls' basketball, boys' and girls' lacrosse, boys' and girls' soccer, boys' and girls' volleyball, cheerleading, cross-country, field hockey, football, golf, softball, swimming, tennis, track and field, and wrestling.

In 2008, Patterson Mill captured the UCBAC Susquehanna Division titles in cross country and boys' soccer. The field hockey team also won the 1A North regional championship.

In the 2008-2009 winter sports season, the Huskies Wrestling team claimed first place in the Upper Chesapeake Bay Susquehanna Division, without seniors. Most recently, in the 2010-2011 season of wrestling, the Patterson Mill squad had players reach 1st and 5th at the state championship. 

In Spring 2009, the women's lacrosse team won the 2A-1A South regional championship and continued on to compete in the 2A-1A state championship game.

In Fall 2010, the Huskies Field Hockey team competed at the state championship level against Pocomoke High School, losing 0-1.  This was the first trip to state finals for the Lady Huskies.

The Huskies have three state championships, coming in 2A Women's Basketball, 2014, and 2015, and 1A Women's Basketball in 2017. The school also won a state championship in the girls 4 by 200-meter relay in 2016. The huskies lacrosse team has won back-to-back 1a state championships in 2018 and 2019.

In Spring 2022, the Patterson Mill Tennis team sent a Mens Doubles team to the 1A state tournament. The duo made it to the state final before losing to Liberty High School.

See also
List of Schools in Harford County, Maryland

References

External links
 

Public high schools in Maryland
Harford County Public Schools
Educational institutions established in 2007
Public middle schools in Maryland
2007 establishments in Maryland